Jan Josef Liefers (born 8 August 1964), is a German actor, producer, director and musician.

Life
Liefers was born in Dresden, the son of director Karlheinz Liefers and actress Brigitte Liefers-Wähner. After his apprenticeship he studied at the Hochschule für Schauspielkunst Ernst Busch in Berlin. From 1987 until 1990 he acted at the Deutsches Theater Berlin; after this he moved to the Thalia Theater in Hamburg. His first role in cinema was Alexander von Humboldt in the East German film .

Following that, Liefers appeared in some minor film roles; however, in 1996 he achieved his breakthrough with the Helmut Dietl film . He received the Bayerischer Filmpreis for his role (Bodo Kriegnitz). As a result of this success, he was awarded roles in several German films. He has been playing a pathologist in the famous serial Tatort since 2002.

Liefers is a keen motorcyclist and in 2007 started on a trip of a lifetime from Quito (Ecuador) to Patagonia in South America. Unfortunately, his trip came to a premature end when he was injured avoiding a collision with a young child who ran out in front of his motorbike. In 2008 a film of the trip called "70° West – Entscheidung in Peru" (Decision in Peru) was shown on German TV channel DMAX.

In April 2021, Liefers was a leading figure of a group of German actors criticizing the coronavirus policies in Germany, with the campaign #Allesdichtmachen (“shut everything down”). The campaign was heavily criticized.

Liefers married actress and singer Anna Loos in 2004. Previously he had been married to Alexandra Tabakova, a Russian actress.

Filmography

  (1989)
  (1991)
 Charlie & Louise – Das doppelte Lottchen (1993)
 Die Partner (1995, TV series, 8 episodes)
 Ich, der Boss (1995, TV film)
  (1997)
 Kidnapping Mom and Dad (1997, TV film)
 Knockin' on Heaven's Door (1997)
 Vergewaltigt – Das Geheimnis einer Nacht (1997, TV film)
 Arielle, die Meerjungfrau (Disney), (German version) voice of Prinz Erik (1997)
 Jack's Baby (1998, TV film)
  (1998)
  (2000, TV film)
 Die Spur meiner Tochter (2000, TV film)
 Death Row (2001, TV film)
 666 – Traue keinem, mit dem du schläfst! (2002)
 Die Frauenversteher – Männer unter sich (2002, TV film)
  (2003, TV film)
  (2005, TV film)
 Madagascar (DreamWorks), (German version) voice of Alex (2005)
 Die Entscheidung (2006, TV film)
  (2006, TV film)
  (2006, TV film)
 :  (2006, TV series episode)
  (2007)
  (2007, TV film)
 Lily C. (2007, TV film)
 The Baader Meinhof Complex (2008)
 Madagascar 2, (German version) voice of Alex (2008)
  (2009, TV film)
  (2010, TV film)
 Simon and the Oaks (2011)
  (since 2012, TV series, 7 episodes)
 Men Do What They Can (2012)
 The Tower (2012, TV film)
  (2012, TV film)
  (2013, TV film)
 Head Full of Honey (2014)
  (2015)
  (2015)
 The Bloom of Yesterday (2016)
 Vier gegen die Bank (2016)
  (2017)

Tatort –  Professor Dr. Karl Friedrich Boerne

In the German television series Tatort, Liefers plays Professor Dr. Karl Friedrich Boerne, the director of the "Institute of Legal Medicine and Forensics" at the University of Münster. The witty scientist loves his job and enjoys life to the fullest, often without considering the feelings of others. Karl-Friedrich Boerne loves the good things in life, plays golf, fences and is fond of classical music, especially if it's loud. But what he loves most are his luxury cars (Jaguar, Mercedes, Audi, Porsche, etc.), which he drives without worrying too much about wrecking them, and the sound of his own voice. Boerne's irony and intellect make him seem cynical and arrogant at times, but still it's evident that there's a good heart beating inside him. His wife left him and ever since Boerne lives alone in his big city apartment. The much smaller neighbouring apartment he let to inspector Frank Thiel. But not only at home the idiosyncratic, quirky forensic physician and the quiet, down-to-earth police officer share a close partnership.

Tatort – Episodes

 2002: Der dunkle Fleck
 2002: Fakten, Fakten
 2003: Dreimal schwarzer Kater
 2003: Sag nichts
 2004: Mörderspiele
 2004: Eine Leiche zuviel
 2005: Der Frauenflüsterer
 2005: Der doppelte Lott
 2006: Das ewig Böse
 2006: Das zweite Gesicht
 2007: Ruhe sanft
 2007: Satisfaktion
 2008: Krumme Hunde
 2008: Wolfsstunde
 2009: Höllenfahrt
 2009: Tempelräuber
 2010: Der Fluch der Mumie
 2010: Spargelzeit
 2011: Herrenabend
 2011: 
 2012: Hinkebein
 2012: Das Wunder von Wolbeck
 2013: Summ, Summ, Summ
 2013: Die chinesische Prinzessin
 2014: Der Hammer
 2014: Mord ist die beste Medizin
 2015: Erkläre Chimäre
 2015: Schwanensee 
 2016: Ein Fuß kommt selten allein
 2016: Feierstunde
 2017: Fangschuss
 2017: Gott Ist Auch Nur Ein Mensch
 2018: Schlangengrube
 2019: Spieglein, Spieglein
 2019: Lakritz 
 2019: Väterchen Frost
 2020: Limbus
 2020: Es Lebe Der König
 2021: Rhythm And Love
 2022: Des Teufels langer Atem
 2022: Propheteus
 2022: Ein Freund, ein guter Freund
 2023: MagicMom

CDs
 Jack's Baby (1999)
 Don't let go (2002)
 Oblivion (2002)
 Soundtrack meiner Kindheit (2007)

Audio books
 2006: Fußball unser – Das Hörbuch
 2006: Brigitte Hörbuch-Edition – Starke Stimmen: Die Männer – Der Reinfall
 2008: Jan Josef Liefers liest den Tatort Fall `Der dunkle Fleck´
 2009: Brigitte Hörbuch-Edition – Starke Stimmen: Die Krimis – Dr. Siri und seine Toten
 2009: Der Kleine Prinz: Das Hörbuch

Awards
 1996: Bayerischer Filmpreis, best newcomer in Rossini
 2000: Television prize of the Deutsche Akademie der Darstellenden Künste, actor award for Halt mich fest
 2000: Bayerischer Fernsehpreis for Jack's Baby
 2003: Bambi for  A Light in Dark Places
 2004: Adolf-Grimme-Preis for the best actor in A Light in Dark Places
 2011: Guldbagge Award for the best supporting actor award for Simon and the Oaks

References

External links

 Official Fanpage (German)
 

1964 births
Living people
Actors from Dresden
German male stage actors
German male film actors
German male television actors
20th-century German male actors
21st-century German male actors
Ernst Busch Academy of Dramatic Arts alumni
Best Supporting Actor Guldbagge Award winners